Ieeja or Aiza is a mini town and known as Mandal Head quarter located in Jogulamba Gadwal district in the state of Telangana. It comes under the Alampur assembly constituency, in the state of Telangana and it was formed as a municipality in 2009. Total Population as per 2011 census is 82,000/-

Villages Under Ieeja (Aiza) Mandal 
 Uthanur
 B.Timmapur
 Eklaspur
 Devabanda
 Bingidoddi
 Thoomukunta
 Jadadoddi
 Yapadinne
 Venkatapur
 Aiza
 Medikonda
 Thothinonidoddi
 Sindhanoor
 Kudakanoor
 Pullikal
 Kesavapuram
 Venisampur
 Chinna Tandrapadu
 Uppala

References 

Mandals in Jogulamba Gadwal district
Jogulamba Gadwal district
Villages in Jogulamba Gadwal district